Breeders' Cup World Thoroughbred Championships is a 2005 video game developed by 4J Studios and published by Bethesda Softworks.

Development
The game was announced in April 2005.

Reception

The Xbox version of the game holds a rating of 47% on Metacritic based on 5 critic reviews.

IGN rated the game a 4.3 of 10 stating "Unless you’re an absolutely massive horse racing fan or an obsessive collector of video games, there’s really no reason to pick this title up".

References

2005 video games
Bethesda Softworks games
Breeders' Cup
Horse racing video games
North America-exclusive video games
PlayStation 2 games
Video games developed in the United Kingdom
Video games set in the United States
Xbox games